The following is the qualification system for the 2023 Central American and Caribbean Games competition.

Qualification system 
A total of 500 athletes will qualify to compete. Each nation may enter a maximum of two athletes in each individual event, and one team per relay event. Each event has a maximum number of competitors and a minimum performance standard. El Salvador as host nation, is granted an automatic athlete slot per event, in the event no one qualifies for that respective event.

The classification in each event will be given by the World Athletics ranking by event between January 1st to May 7, 2023, for Half Marathon, Walk, Combined Trials and 10,000 meters, For the rest of the tests, the established dates are from the May 1st 2022 to May 7, 2023.

Qualification timeline

Quota per event

Track events 
Ranking as of December 27, 2022

Men's track events

Men's 100 m

Men's 200 m

Men's 400 m

Men's 800 m

Men's 1500 m

Men's 5000 m

Men's 10,000 m

Men's 110 m hurdles

Men's 400 m hurdles

Men's 3000 m steeplechase

Women's track events

Women's 100 m

Women's 200 m

Women's 400 m

Women's 800 m

Women's 1500 m

Women's 5000 m

Women's 10,000 m

Women's 100 m hurdles

Women's 400 m hurdles

Women's 3000 m steeplechase

Road events

Men's road events

Men's half marathon

Men's 20 km walk

Men's 35 km walk

Women's road events

Women's marathon

Women's 20 km walk

Women's 35 km walk

Field events

Men's field events

Men's high jump

Men's pole vault

Men's long jump

Men's triple jump

Men's shot put

Men's discus throw

Men's hammer throw

Men's javelin throw

Women's field events

Women's high jump

Women's pole vault

Women's long jump

Women's triple jump

Women's shot put

Women's discus throw

Women's hammer throw

Women's javelin throw

Combined events

Men's decathlon

Women's heptathlon

Relay events 
Each relay team will be composed of 5 athletes (4 athletes for the mixed teams, 2 men and 2 women). Athletes already qualified for the 100 m and 400 m events are automatically included in their respective relay teams.

Men's 4 × 100 m relay

Men's 4 × 400 m relay

Women's 4 × 100 m relay

Women's 4 × 400 m relay

Mixed 4 × 400 m relay

References 

Qualification for the 2023 Central American and Caribbean Games